The Hulme Trust (also known as "Hulme’s Charity") is an educational trust and charity (No. 532297) founded in 1691 by the bequest of the English lawyer and landowner William Hulme (c.1631–91).

History 

With his only son, Banaster Hulme (1658–73) having died at the age of 15, William Hulme left his property to his wife and after her death to be held in trust forming “Hulme’s Charity”.

The Trust was to use the money for educational purposes: Hulmeian Exhibitions were established at Brasenose College, Oxford to support four poor students through their studies and for four years after graduation. The trustees determined that the exhibitions should be limited to the sons of Lancashire clergy. The first Exhibitioners were chosen in 1692. As the wealth of the trust increased through profitable property investments, several Acts of Parliament allowed the Trustees to spend the money on other purposes so the number of Exhibitioners was increased and a lectureship in Divinity established at Brasenose College, Oxford.

In 1827, the Trust was allowed to begin purchasing Anglican benefices and bought 28 in total (with 21 in Lancashire alone). The Trust was also allowed to build and provide funds for church repairs. These purchases proved controversial, with some regarding feeling the trust was being misused.

In 1881, the Trust was reorganised. It was to provide eight Senior and twelve Junior Exhibitioners at Brasenose College, Oxford and annual sums to Hulme Hall – a hall of residence for Anglican students in Owens College (then the only constituent college of the University of Manchester). It was also to provide an annual sum to Owen's College, Manchester itself. Hulme Hall was to award twenty scholarships and other scholarships were to be funded at Owen's College, with an annual sum to fund Professors of Classical/English Literature or Ancient/Modern History, and two Hulme Scholarships from 1893.

The Charity Commissioners empowered the Trust to use its funds to establish and endow schools – it established, in Manchester, William Hulme's Grammar School (in 1887), re-founded the existing Oldham Grammar School as Hulme Grammar School, in 1887, and funded new buildings for the existing school Bury Grammar School. Scholarships were also created to allow students from these schools to study at Brasenose College, Oxford. Further grants were given to Manchester High School for Girls, Manchester Grammar School, Pendleton High School for Girls and to re-establish the existing Queen Elizabeth Grammar School, Middleton.

Trustees 
Many of the Trustees have been important figures and some of these have included:

See also

References

Bibliography 
 
 
 
 
 

1691 establishments
charitable trusts
educational charities
Hulme Trust